Redwood City station is a Caltrain commuter rail station located in Redwood City, California.  It is served by all trains. The station has two side platforms serving the two tracks of the Peninsula Subdivision.

The original station building was built in 1902. The structure burned down in 1979 and was replaced with a "temporary" station in a trailer. A new waiting shelter was built in 1995, designed to emulate the original though with the addition of a clock tower.

References

External links

Caltrain - Redwood City station

Caltrain stations in San Mateo County, California
Clock towers in California
Redwood City, California
Railway stations in the United States opened in 1902
Former Southern Pacific Railroad stations in California